Black hole complementarity is a conjectured solution to the black hole information paradox, proposed by Leonard Susskind, Larus Thorlacius, and Gerard 't Hooft.

Overview
Ever since Stephen Hawking suggested information is lost in an evaporating black hole once it passes through the event horizon and is inevitably destroyed at the singularity, and that this can turn pure quantum states into mixed states, some physicists have wondered if a complete theory of quantum gravity might be able to conserve information with a unitary time evolution. But how can this be possible if information cannot escape the event horizon without traveling faster than light? This seems to rule out Hawking radiation as the carrier of the missing information. It also appears as if information cannot be "reflected" at the event horizon as there is nothing special about it locally.

Leonard Susskind proposed a radical resolution to this problem by claiming that the information is both reflected at the event horizon and passes through the event horizon and cannot escape, with the catch being no observer can confirm both stories simultaneously. According to an external observer, the infinite time dilation at the horizon itself makes it appear as if it takes an infinite amount of time to reach the horizon. He also postulated a stretched horizon, which is a membrane hovering about a Planck length outside the event horizon and which is both physical and hot. According to the external observer, infalling information heats up the stretched horizon, which then reradiates it as Hawking radiation, with the entire evolution being unitary. However, according to an infalling observer, nothing special happens at the event horizon itself, and both the observer and the information will hit the singularity. This isn't to say there are two copies of the information lying about — one at or just outside the horizon, and the other inside the black hole — as that would violate the no-cloning theorem. Instead, an observer can only detect the information at the horizon itself, or inside, but never both simultaneously. Complementarity is a feature of the quantum mechanics of noncommuting observables, and Susskind proposed that both stories are complementary in the quantum sense, that there is no contradiction which also means no violation of linearity in quantum mechanics. 

An infalling observer will see the point of entry of the information as being localized on the event horizon, while an external observer will notice the information being spread out uniformly over the entire stretched horizon before being re-radiated, and perceives the event horizon as a dynamical membrane.
To an infalling observer, information and entropy pass through the horizon with nothing of interest happening. To an external observer, the information and entropy is absorbed into the stretched horizon which acts like a dissipative fluid with entropy, viscosity and electrical conductivity. See the membrane paradigm for more details. The stretched horizon is conducting with surface charges which rapidly spread out logarithmically over the horizon.

Recently, it appears that black hole complementarity combined with the monogamy of entanglement suggests the existence of an AMPS "firewall", where high energy, short wavelength photons are present in the horizon, although this is still being hypothesised.

References 

Quantum gravity